H. R. Poindexter (c1936 – September 24, 1977) was a theatre lighting designer and set designer. He has designed many Broadway productions and received a Tony Award for Best Lighting Design for his work on Paul Sill's Story Theatre. He is the father of Larry Poindexter.

He died of a heart attack at his home in Los Angeles.

References

External links 

Year of birth missing
1977 deaths
Lighting designers